Stranger is a South Korean crime thriller drama television series. Produced by Signal Entertainment and IOK Media, it was created by Studio Dragon writer Lee Soo-yeon and broadcast on tvN from June 10, 2017. The series was renewed for a second season, which premiered on August 15, 2020.

The series was a hit with both domestic and international viewers, and received favorable reviews for its tight plot, gripping sequences and strong performances. It was featured on New York Times list of Best TV Shows of 2017, and won several awards including the Grand Prize for television at the Baeksang Arts Awards.

Synopsis
In the first season, Hwang Si-mok (Cho Seung-woo) is an exemplary prosecutor who suffers from hypersensitivity to certain sound frequencies. After undergoing corrective surgery, he lost his sense of empathy and lacks social skills. While investigating a murder, he meets Police Lieutenant Han Yeo-jin (Bae Doona), who assists his efforts to solve the case. As they begin to unravel the mystery behind the murder, they find that their efforts are continually being obstructed by participants in a major corruption conspiracy between the Prosecutors' Office and a private chaebol (conglomerate).

In the second season, set two years later, a dispute arises between the Prosecutors' Office and the National Police Agency, with the former wanting control over all investigative proceedings while the latter seeks autonomous authority to conduct investigations. In the midst of their respective agencies' conflict, Hwang Si-mok and Han Yeo-jin team up to conduct their own independent investigation of a concealed case.

Cast and characters

 Cho Seung-woo as Hwang Si-mok
 Bae Doona as Han Yeo-jin
 Lee Joon-hyuk as Seo Dong-jae
 Yoo Jae-myung as Lee Chang-joon (season 1; guest season 2)
 Shin Hye-sun as Young Eun-soo (season 1; guest season 2)
 Yoon Se-ah as Lee Yeon-jae (season 2; recurring season 1)
 Jeon Hye-jin as Choi Bit (season 2)
 Choi Moo-sung as Woo Tae-ha (season 2)

Episodes

Production

Development
The entire series was written by Lee Soo-yeon who was inspired by the Korean adage "We cannot rule those who want nothing" to create the character of Si-mok. Ahn Gil-ho directed the majority of the first season with the assistance of Yoo Je-won, while Park Hyun-seok took over the filming duties for the second season. Unlike usual South Korean dramas, the series was developed as a potential multi-seasonal program, with most of the filming have already been pre-produced prior to its broadcast.

Casting
In January 2017, Cho Seung-woo and Bae Doona were offered the lead roles. The same month Shin Hye-sun was added to the cast. It was the first television drama Cho Seung-woo had accepted since God's Gift - 14 Days in 2014, after venturing into musical theatre for seven years. For the second season, cast members Cho Seung-woo, Bae Doona, Lee Joon-hyuk and Yoon Se-ah, were all confirmed to reprise their roles. Jeon Hye-jin and Choi Moo-sung were also confirmed to join the lead cast in January 2020.

Filming
Filming of the first season began in April 2017, preceded by the first script reading with the cast at the CJ E&M Center in Seoul. Script reading for the second season took place in January 2020.

Music

An accompanying soundtrack compilation to Stranger was released by Mog Communications and Kakao M on September 13, 2017, in South Korea. It was later reissued by Universal Music Group in overseas markets on May 11, 2018. A three-disc album, the latter two discs features music composed by Kim Jun-seok and Jung Sae-rin for the program. Ten songs were released from the soundtrack as singles in numbered parts from June to July 2017: "끝도없이 (Ad Infinitum)" by Richard Parkers, "먼지 (Dust)" Everlua, "소나기 (Downpour)" by Oohyo, "괴물처럼 (Monster Like)" by Tei, "웃어요 (Smile)" by Han Hee Jung & Sorae, the titular track "비밀의 숲 (Stranger)" by Yoon Do-hyun, "사랑할 것 처럼 (As if to Love)" by Kim Kookheon of Myteen, "물결 (A Billow)" by Yein of Lovelyz, "굿바이 잘가요 (Goodbye)"/"Back in Time" by Peter Han, and "묻는다 (Ask)" by Jung Won-bo of NeighBro & Jun Sang-geun. Of these, the songs "소나기 (Downpour)" and "사랑할 것 처럼 (As if to Love)" have managed to enter the South Korean Gaon BGM Music Chart at numbers 80 and 79, respectively.

Stranger OST Track listing

OverturePart 1Part 2

Part 3
Part 4

Release
The pilot episode of Stranger aired on June 10, 2017 on tvN, replacing Chicago Typewriter. Netflix secured the worldwide streaming rights for the series for US$200,000 per episode, except in Korea and China, and released them in simultaneous broadcast with tvN as a Netflix original program. The Korea Times reported that Bae Doona, who had previously appeared in the Netflix original series Sense8, proved to be crucial in the purchase of the drama. tvN affiliate tvN Asia also aired the program in selected Asian markets beginning on June 16, 2018. A second season was commissioned by tvN, set to be released with Netflix on the same day. It premiered on August 15, 2020, replacing It's Okay to Not Be Okay.

Reception

Critical response
In an article by columnist Dena Daw for Screen Rant, Stranger was described as a "domestic and international success". Though ratings-wise, the program was not a "smash hit", pundits and audiences praised it as a "league of its own".  Korean culture critic Ha Jae-geun described the character as a "fantasy that was borne out of a time of distrust". In her review for The Korea Times, columnist Park Jin-hai commended the writing as "finely intertwined", and wrote that audiences gave a strong response to this "drama for thinking people". The New York Times listed the series in tenth place as their The Best TV Shows of 2017.

At the 54th Baeksang Arts Awards, the series received eight nominations, including two considerations for Grand Prize for Television, winning one for the whole series. Cho Seung-woo and Lee Soo-yeon also won Best Television Actor and Best Television Screenplay, respectively. In a Gallup Korea poll, audiences aged 19 and above selected Stranger as their 12th favorite show in July 2017. While Google Korea listed the series as the ninth most-searched television program of 2017.

Viewership
According to data published by Nielsen Korea, the pilot episode of the series was seen by 3.041% of total nationwide viewers, in metropolitan Seoul, it earned 3.2% rating, which made it the highest-rated program of the day among non-terrestrial channel programs. The program achieved its highest rating on the first-season finale, earning 6.568% nationwide rating and a 7.622% rating within Seoul-based viewers. On average, it was seen by 4.562% of total viewership. On the TNmS rating system, the series premiered with a 3.2% rating and ended its first season with a 7.1% rating. The last episode recorded noticeably a strong rating performances as it took the lead rating for the first time against hit variety show Hyori's Homestay that aired in same time slot and became the highest rated program of the day among non-terrestrial channel programs.

Awards and nominations

See also
 List of highest-rated dramas in South Korean cable television

Notes

References

External links
 
 
 Stranger Official website 
 
 Stranger 2 Official website 
 

2010s South Korean television series
2017 South Korean television series debuts
2020s South Korean television series
Korean-language Netflix original programming
Television series by Studio Dragon
Television series by Signal Entertainment Group
TVN (South Korean TV channel) television dramas
South Korean crime television series
South Korean thriller television series
Television shows set in Seoul
Television series by IOK Media
Korean-language Netflix exclusive international distribution programming
Television series about prosecutors